Liam Smith may also refer to:

Liam Smith (boxer), English boxer
Liam Smith (cricketer) (born 1997), English cricketer
Liam Smith (footballer, born 1995), English footballer
Liam Smith (footballer, born 1996), Scottish footballer
Liam Smith, character in The Clinic

See also
Leon Smith (disambiguation)
Lee Smith (disambiguation)